Looking for Alaska is an American teen drama streaming television miniseries created by Josh Schwartz. It is based on the 2005 novel of the same name by John Green. After a film adaptation was repeatedly delayed at Paramount Pictures, Hulu finalized a deal and ordered an eight-episode limited series. It stars Charlie Plummer and Kristine Froseth in the two lead roles Miles Halter and Alaska Young, respectively. The miniseries premiered on Hulu on October 18, 2019. It received acclaim from critics as well as fans of the book, with praise going toward its writing, acting and faithfulness to the original source material.

Premise
Looking For Alaska tells the story of a teenage boy named Miles Halter who is obsessed with famous last words and seeking "the Great Perhaps", a concept inspired by the last words of poet Francois Rabelais. This desire leads him to enroll at Culver Creek Academy in Alabama, hoping to find something less boring and safe than the life he's always lived and gain a deeper perspective on life. At Culver Creek, he befriends his roommate Chip "The Colonel" Martin, who introduces him to Alaska Young, whom he later falls in love with, and Takumi Hikohito. Throughout his "new life" at the school, Miles learns many lessons about life, love, and the art of letting go.

Cast

Main
Charlie Plummer as Miles "Pudge" Halter, a new high school junior at Culver Creek Academy from Orlando, Florida
Kristine Froseth as Alaska Young, the girl who catches Pudge's eye when he arrives at Culver Creek Academy
Denny Love as Chip "The Colonel" Martin, Pudge's roommate and friend
Jay Lee as Takumi Hikohito, Alaska and The Colonel's best friend
Sofia Vassilieva as Lara Buterskaya, a Romanian girl that Alaska sets up on a date with Pudge
Landry Bender as Sara, The Colonel's girlfriend and later ex-girlfriend
Uriah Shelton as Longwell Chase, one of the wealthy kids known as the Weekday Warriors as they were able to go home each weekend
Jordan Connor as Kevin, a member of the Weekday Warriors
Timothy Simons as Mr. Starnes, aka "The Eagle", the headmaster of Culver Creek Academy
Ron Cephas Jones as Dr. Hyde, an elderly religions teacher at Culver Creek Academy

Recurring

 Meg Wright as Marya, Alaska's former roommate and best friend who gets expelled at the start of the new semester.
 Lucy Faust as Madame O'Malley, the French teacher at Culver Creek Academy
 Henry Zaga as Jake, Alaska's boyfriend who attends college
 Deneen Tyler as Dolores Martin, The Colonel's single mother

Guest
 Brandon Stanley as Paul, Marya's boyfriend who gets expelled at the start of the new semester 
Rachel Matthews as Fiona, Jake's best friend

Episodes

Production

Development
The film rights to the novel were acquired by Paramount Pictures in 2005 shortly before the novel was published. The screenplay was potentially going to be written and directed by Josh Schwartz (creator of The O.C.) but, due to a lack of interest by Paramount, the production had been shelved indefinitely. It had been reported that Paramount was putting the screenplay in review due to the success of the film adaptation of John Green's breakout novel, The Fault in Our Stars. On February 27, 2015, The Hollywood Reporter announced that Scott Neustadter and Michael H. Weber, screenwriters for Temple Hill Entertainment who had worked on adaptations for The Fault in Our Stars and Paper Towns, would be writing and executive producing for the film. Paramount was actively casting the latest version of the screenplay, which was written by Sarah Polley. Rebecca Thomas was set to direct. Green also confirmed that Neustadter and Weber were still involved with the film. In August 2015, it was announced filming would begin in the fall in Michigan. It was later announced that filming would begin in early 2016 because of lack of casting decisions. Later in 2016, Green announced in a Vlogbrothers video and on social media that the film adaptation had once again been shelved indefinitely.  Green has voiced his frustration of the development process of the film adaptation over the years. He quoted, "It has always fallen apart for one reason or another." In May 2018, Hulu finalized a deal with Josh Schwartz and Stephanie Savage, and proceeded to order an eight-episode limited series based on the book. Schwartz served as executive producer and showrunner, while Savage served as executive producer alongside John Green, Jessica Tuchinsky, Mark Waters, Marty Bowen, and Isaac Klausner.

Casting

In October 2018, Charlie Plummer and Kristine Froseth were cast as the lead roles of the series, portraying Miles "Pudge" Halter and Alaska Young, respectively. In March 2019, Hulu announced six new cast members had joined the limited series; Denny Love, Jay Lee, Sofia Vassilieva, Landry Bender, Uriah Shelton, and Jordan Connor. The following month, Timothy Simons and Ron Cephas Jones were announced to join the cast as The Eagle and Dr. Hyde, respectively. In May 2019, it was reported that Rachel Matthews and Henry Zaga had been cast in recurring roles.

Filming locations
The series was primarily shot in Louisiana. Episode 1 offers a glimpse of the Piggly Wiggly in Independence. Miss Ann's Fast Food in Amite pops up occasionally. The "school" the kids attend is really Solomon Episcopal Conference Center in Loranger.

The Audubon Zoo's elephant sculpture shows up in Episode 6. The Mandeville end of the Lake Pontchartrain Causeway approach crops up in Episode 7. The Abita Springs Town Hall plays a police station in Episode 8.

Distribution
In April 2020, Looking for Alaska was released in Canada on CBC Gem.

Music

The soundtrack album for the miniseries, titled Looking for Alaska (Music from the Original Series), was released digitally on October 18, 2019, via Paramount and Sony Music Entertainment. It is a compilation album that consists of songs used in the miniseries.

Reception
Looking For Alaska received acclaim from critics and readers of the book, with praises going towards its writing, performances (particularly that of Plummer, Froseth and Love), visuals, its soundtrack (with critics favorably comparing it to Schwartz's other series The O.C.), directing, and improvements upon its source material. On review aggregator Rotten Tomatoes, the miniseries holds a "Certified Fresh" approval rating of 91% based on 35 reviews, with an average rating of 8.5/10. The website's critical consensus reads, "Bittersweet and beautifully performed, Looking for Alaska is the rare adaptation that deviates from its source material only to find something even better." On Metacritic, it has a weighted average score of 72 out of 100, based on 10 critics, indicating "generally favorable reviews."

Critics called the series Schwartz's finest series to date. Kathryn VanArendonk of Vulture called it a "rare adaptation that dismantles the original in order to build something that works better" and praised Love's charismatic performance as The Colonel. IndieWire's LaToya Ferguson graded the miniseries with an "A" and said, "Looking For Alaska is your standard, tried and true, coming-of-age story. And for that, it stands out from the rest." She also praised Plummer's performance as Miles, saying that he "captures the milquetoast nature of the character (both the funny and frustrating aspects of that), while also finding a way to make your heart break for him." The Guardian's writer Rebecca Nicholson gave the miniseries a 3 out of 5 stars and called the performances of the young cast "excellent" and Emmy-worthy (most notably that of Froseth, Love and Plummer), and further praising the characterization of The Colonel.

Alan Sepinwall of Rolling Stone gave the miniseries a 4 out of 5 stars and said, "It's a familiar coming-of-age story, but one executed at a high level and with far more thought than usual given to all the kids who were forced to grow up long before the main character has to". He also praised the cast as "exceedingly charming" and singling out the performances' of Froseth and Love. Variety's Caroline Framke also praised the cast (particularly Froseth and Love), while further highlighting the former's performance as Alaska, saying that "As Alaska, she has to portray a character alternately depicted as mysterious and vulnerable, flinty and fragile, wildly intelligent and crushingly naive. The series and Froseth take great and obvious pains to flesh Alaska out beyond the basic role of Miles’ first love, which could so easily flatten her into nothing at all". Petrana Radulovic of Polygon summarized the miniseries as "a messy, raw depiction of grief — ultimately, what the book was supposed to be about, and what the show captures better" and called Froseth's performance "brilliant". Daniel Fienberg of The Hollywood Reporter praised the performances of Froseth and Plummer, calling the former "a marvel" and highlighting the latter's ability to nail "a tougher task" for playing Miles successfully.

References

External links

2010s American drama television miniseries
2010s American high school television series
2010s American mystery television series
2010s American teen drama television series
2019 American television series debuts
2019 American television series endings
American teen drama web series
English-language television shows
Hulu original programming
Television shows based on American novels
Television series about teenagers
Television series by Paramount Television
Television series set in 2005
Television shows about death
Television shows filmed in Louisiana
Television shows set in Alabama
Works about driving under the influence